Carlos Gomes may refer to:
 Antônio Carlos Gomes, Brazilian composer
 Carlos Gomes, Rio Grande do Sul, Brazilian municipality
 Carlos Gomes Júnior, Prime Minister of Guinea-Bissau
Pintinho, real name Carlos Alberto Gomes, born 1954, represented Brazil at the 1972 Summer Olympics
Carlos Alberto Gomes de Jesus, Brazilian footballer
Carlos Alberto Gomes de Lima, Brazilian footballer
Carlos António Gomes, Portuguese football goalkeeper
Carlos Mendes Gomes, Spanish footballer
Carlos Domingomes Gomes, Portuguese film director
Carlos Alberto Parreira Gomes, Brazilian footballer and manager
Carlos Alberto dos Santos Gomes, Brazilian footballer
Carlos Carvalhas, full name Carlos Alberto do Vale Gomes Carvalhas, Portuguese politician